Inverfarigaig is a hamlet at the mouth of the River Farigaig, on the south-east shore of Loch Ness in Inverness-shire, Scottish Highlands and is in the Scottish council area of Highland.

Geography
The villages of Bunloit and Balbeg are directly across Loch Ness, and the village of Drumnadrochit is close to them. The prominent peak of Meall Fuar-mhonaidh is also visible across the loch.

Iron Age Fort
Above Inverfarigaig is the Iron Age fort of Dun Deardail. Deirdre and the three sons of Usnach were meant to have lived near the fort for some of the time they stayed in Scotland.

The fort was built by the Celts some time around 700BC and has been found to be partly vitrified.

References

Populated places in Inverness committee area
Loch Ness